About Farewell is the fourth studio album by indie folk musician Alela Diane. It was released July 30, 2013 on her own Rusted Blue Records.

Track listing

Charts

References

2013 albums
Alela Diane albums